This is a timeline documenting events of Jazz in the year 1967.

Events

June
 12 – The 2nd Montreux Jazz Festival started in Montreux, Switzerland (June 12 – 19).
 30 – The 14th Newport Jazz Festival started in Newport, Rhode Island (June 30 – July 3).

Unknown date
 Nina Simone wins female Jazz singer of the year.
 Carla Bley was married to Michael Mantler.

Album releases

Bill Evans: Further Conversations with Myself
Pharoah Sanders: Tauhid 
Stan Getz: Sweet Rain
Sun Ra: Atlantis
Gary Burton: A Genuine Tong Funeral
Sam Rivers: Dimensions and Extensions
Roscoe Mitchell: Old Quartet 
Bill Dixon: Intents and Purposes 
George Russell: Othello Ballet Suite 
Muhal Richard Abrams: Levels and Degrees of Light 
Archie Shepp: The Magic of Ju-Ju 
Jackie McLean: New and Old Gospel 
Roland Kirk: The Inflated Tear
Frank Wright: Your Prayer
Spontaneous Music Ensemble: Withdrawal
Peter Brötzmann Trio: For Adolphe Sax 
Miles Davis: Miles Smiles  
Jackie McLean: Demon's Dance 
Miles Davis: Sorcerer
Duke Ellington: The Far East Suite
Gary Burton: Duster
John Coltrane: Expression
McCoy Tyner: The Real McCoy 
Wayne Shorter: Schizophrenia 
Lee Konitz: The Lee Konitz Duets 
Paul Bley: Virtuosi 
Lester Bowie: Numbers 1 & 2 
Paul Bley: Ballads 
Charles Tyler: Eastern Man Alone 
Hugh Masekela: Hugh Masekela's Latest
Hugh Masekela: Hugh Masekela Is Alive and Well at the Whisky (live album)
Antonio Carlos Jobim: Wave

Standards

Deaths

 January
 9 – Rob Swope, American trombonist (born 1926).

 February
 11
 Edmond Hall, American clarinetist and bandleader (born 1901).
 Simon Brehm, Swedish upright bassist (born 1921).
 12 – Muggsy Spanier, American cornetist (born 1901).
 25 – Fats Pichon, American pianist, singer, bandleader, and songwriter (born 1906).

 March
 7 – Willie Smith, American saxophonist, clarinetist, and singer (born 1910).
 8 – Herman Chittison, American pianist (born 1908).
 23 – Pete Johnson, American pianist (born 1904).

 April
 12 – Buster Bailey, American clarinetist and saxophonist (born 1902).
 17 – Red Allen, American trumpeter and vocalist (born 1908).

 May
 19 – Elmo Hope, American jazz pianist, composer, and arranger (born 1923).
 23 – Carl-Henrik Norin, Swedish saxophonist (born 1920).
 31 – Billy Strayhorn, American composer and pianist (born 1915).

 August
 24 – Amanda Randolph, American actress, singer, and musician (born 1896).

 July
 17 – John Coltrane, American saxophonist and composer (born 1926).

 September
 7 – Rex Stewart, American cornetist, Duke Ellington Orchestra (born 1907).
 23 – Boots Mussulli, Italian-American jazz saxophonist (born 1915).
 25 – Stuff Smith, American violinist (born 1909).

 October
 19 – Billy Banks, American singer (born 1908).

 November
 8 – Keg Johnson, American trombonist (born 1908).
 10 – Ida Cox, African-American singer and vaudeville performer (born 1888).
 16 – Jimmy Archey, American trombonist (born 1902).

 December
 29 – Paul Whiteman, American bandleader, composer, orchestral director, and violinist (born 1890).

 Unknown date
 Randy Brooks, American trumpeter and bandleader (born 1919).

Births

 January
 25 – D. D. Jackson, Canadian pianist and composer.
 29 – Marc Cary, American pianist.

 February
 3 – Børge Petersen-Øverleir, Norwegian guitarist.
 7 – Vassilis Tsabropoulos, Greek concert pianist, conductor, and composer.
 12 – Stein Inge Brækhus, Norwegian drummer.
 18 – Jeanfrançois Prins, Belgian guitarist and record producer.
 22 – Audun Erlien, Norwegian bassist.
 26 – Audun Skorgen, Norwegian bassist.

 March
 13 – Håkon Storm-Mathisen, Norwegian guitarist.
 31 – Ivar Kolve, Norwegian vibraphonist and percussionist.

 April
 5 – Alex Harding, American saxophonist.
 14 – Steve Davis, American trombonist.
 15 – Gerald Gradwohl, Austrian guitarist, Tangerine Dream.
 16 – Junko Onishi, Japanese pianist.
 27 – Tommy Smith, Scottish saxophonist, composer and educator.

 May
 18 – Svein Folkvord, Norwegian bassist.
 23 – Charlie Hunter, American guitarist.
 29 – Mark Nightingale, English trombonist.
 31 – Anne Wolf, Belgian pianist.

 June
 1 – Hilaria Kramer, Swiss trumpet, singer, and composer.
 7 – Lars Gulliksson, Swedish saxophonist and composer.
 10 – Charnett Moffett, American bassist and composer.

 August
 3 – Jim Black, American drummer.
 11 – Petter Wettre, Norwegian saxophonist.
 14 – Rami Eskelinen, Finnish drummer, Trio Töykeät

 September
 6 – Claire Martin, English singer.
 11 – Harry Connick Jr., American singer and pianist.
 13 – Sascha Ley, Luxembourgian singer.
 14 – Majken Christiansen, Danish-Norwegian singer.
 21 – Duncan Hopkins, English-born composer and bassist.
 26 – Steffen Schorn, German saxophonist snd composer.

 October
 3 – Carsten Dahl, Danish pianist.

 November
 2 – Kurt Elling, American singer, composer, lyricist, and vocalese performer.
 3
 Maria Răducanu, Romanian singer and songwriter.
 Peter Bernstein, American guitarist.
 Steven Wilson, English progressive rock-musician.
 19 – Dhafer Youssef, Tunisian composer, singer, and oud player.

 December
 Jacob Fischer, Danish guitarist.

 Unknown date
 Martha D Lewis, British-Cypriot singer.
 Nikolaj Hess, Danish pianist, composer, producer, and arranger.
 Tom Bancroft, British drummer and composer.

See also

 1960s in jazz
 List of years in jazz
 1967 in music

References

Bibliography

External links 
 History Of Jazz Timeline: 1967 at All About Jazz

Jazz
Jazz by year